The 1989 Associate Members' Cup Final, known as the Sherpa Van Trophy for sponsorship reasons, was the 6th final of the domestic football cup competition for teams from the Third Division and Fourth Division. The final was played at Wembley Stadium, London on 28 May 1989, and was contested by Bolton Wanderers and Torquay United. Bolton won the match 4–1, with Julian Darby, Dean Crombie, Trevor Morgan and Jeff Chandler scoring the goals for the winning team.

Match details

External links
Official website

Associate Members' Cup Final 1989
EFL Trophy Finals
Associate Members' Cup Final 1989
Associate Members' Cup Final 1989